Rajdhani is a Nepali language daily newspaper published from Kathmandu.

See also
List of newspapers in Nepal
Media of Nepal

References

External links

Daily newspapers published in Nepal
Nepali-language newspapers